Minuscule 1071 (in the Gregory-Aland numbering). It is a Greek minuscule manuscript of the four Gospels. It is dated to the 12th century.

Description 

This twelfth-century copy of the four Gospels, now in the Laura on Mount Athos, contains the so-called Jerusalem colophon referred to in the description of codex 157. Streeter classified its text as a tertiary witness to the Caesarean type.  According to the Claremont Profile Method it represents the Alexandrian text-type as a core member.

See also 
 List of New Testament minuscules
 Textual criticism
 Biblical manuscript

References 

Greek New Testament minuscules
12th-century biblical manuscripts